Divya Tewar (born 1 August 1984 in Haryana) is an Indian judoka. She represented India at the 2008 Summer Olympics in Beijing in the 78 kg category, but failed to qualify for the finals.

She first lost to Cuba's Yalennis Castillo in the preliminary round, and was then beaten by Kazakhstan's Sagat Abikeyeva in the first repechage.

See also
India at the 2008 Summer Olympics

Notes and references

Olympic judoka of India
Judoka at the 2008 Summer Olympics
Indian female judoka
1984 births
Living people
Indian female martial artists
Sportswomen from Haryana
21st-century Indian women
21st-century Indian people
Martial artists from Haryana